Cory Niefer (born 18 October 1975) is a Canadian sports shooter. He competed in the Men's 10 metre air rifle and the 50 m rifle prone events at the 2012 Summer Olympics. He was the first individual Canadian to qualify for the 2012 Olympics.

References

External links
 

1975 births
Living people
Canadian male sport shooters
Olympic shooters of Canada
Shooters at the 2012 Summer Olympics
Sportspeople from Yorkton
Shooters at the 2015 Pan American Games
Pan American Games competitors for Canada
21st-century Canadian people